Aaron Addison Gordon (born September 16, 1995) is an American professional basketball player for the Denver Nuggets of the National Basketball Association (NBA). He played one year of college basketball for the University of Arizona before being selected by the Magic with the fourth overall pick in the 2014 NBA draft. Gordon has gained notoriety as one of the all-time greatest competitors in the NBA Slam Dunk Contest; in 2016, he lost a close matchup to Zach LaVine, and in 2020, he narrowly lost to Derrick Jones Jr.

High school career
Gordon attended Archbishop Mitty High School in San Jose, California and started on the varsity basketball team for four years, winning two Division II state basketball championships in his sophomore and junior seasons. He led Mitty to its third straight state title game in his senior year, but his team lost in the inaugural Open Division final.

As a freshman in 2009–10, Gordon started in 28 of 41 games and averaged 11.8 points, 10.1 rebounds and 2.1 blocks per game. He also competed on the school's track and field team as a thrower and played summer basketball for the Oakland Soldiers.

As a sophomore in 2010–11, Gordon helped his team win Mitty's first state title in men's basketball. His team also captured the WCAL regular season and playoff crowns, CCS Division II title and Nor-Cal championship. They finished with a 32–2 record and closed the season on a 20–0 winning streak. He started in all 34 games and averaged 16.4 points, 12.5 rebounds and 3.6 blocks per game. He scored 17 points and hauled in a state championship record 21 rebounds in the 2011 title game.

As a junior in 2011–12, Gordon averaged 22.9 points, 12.8 rebounds, 2.6 assists and 2.3 blocks per game. In the state basketball tournament, he averaged 27.0 points per game before finding out he had been playing with mononucleosis. He was chosen as the California Mr. Basketball Player of the Year. The last junior to be Mr. Basketball in California was Tyson Chandler in 2000, and before him, Jason Kidd in 1991.

As a senior in 2012–13, Gordon averaged 21.6 points, a school-record 15.7 rebounds and 3.3 blocks per game in leading Archbishop Mitty to a 28–6 record and a runner-up finish in the CIF Open Division.

Gordon committed to the University of Arizona on April 2, 2013, announcing his decision in a press conference before the 2013 McDonald's All-American Game. After a 24-point, 8-rebound performance leading the West to a 110–99 victory, Gordon was named the game's MVP.

On January 17, 2020, Archbishop Mitty retired Gordon's number 32.

College career
At Arizona, on February 13, 2014, Gordon was named one of the 30 finalists for the Naismith College Player of the Year. He was named to the All-Pac-12 first team, as well as earning Pac-12 Freshman Player of the Year and Pac-12 All-Freshman team honors.

On April 15, 2014, Gordon declared for the NBA draft, forgoing his final three years of college eligibility.

Professional career

Orlando Magic (2014–2021)

2014–15 season
On June 26, 2014, Gordon was selected with the fourth overall pick in the 2014 NBA draft by the Orlando Magic. On July 2, he signed with the Magic and joined them for the 2014 NBA Summer League. After appearing in the first 11 games of the 2014–15 season, Gordon was ruled out indefinitely on November 16 after he fractured a bone in his left foot in the Magic's loss to the Washington Wizards the night before. He returned to action on January 18, 2015 against the Oklahoma City Thunder after missing 32 games. On April 4, he recorded his first career double-double with 10 points and 12 rebounds in a 97–90 win over the Milwaukee Bucks.

2015–16 season
In July 2015, Gordon re-joined the Magic for the 2015 NBA Summer League, where he averaged 21.7 points, 11.7 rebounds, 2.7 assists, 1.3 steals and 1.7 blocks in three games. On November 4, 2015, he scored a career-high 19 points in a loss to the Houston Rockets. On January 31, 2016, he tied his career high of 19 points and grabbed 14 rebounds in a 119–114 win over the Boston Celtics. He went on to record 12 points and a career-high 16 rebounds the following night against the San Antonio Spurs. During the 2016 NBA All-Star Weekend, Gordon was the runner-up to Zach LaVine in the Slam Dunk Contest. Their battle through two tie-breakers in the final round drew comparisons to the showdown between Michael Jordan and Dominique Wilkins in 1988. Gordon utilised Stuff the Magic Dragon, his team's 6½-ft tall mascot, in his dunks; his final dunk involved him jumping over Stuff while passing the ball under both legs. On February 25, he had another 19-point outing in a 130–114 loss to the Golden State Warriors. Three days later, he set a new career high with 22 points in a 130–116 win over the Philadelphia 76ers. On April 13, in the Magic's season finale, Gordon tied his career high of 22 points in a 117–103 loss to the Charlotte Hornets.

2016–17 season

On December 14, 2016, Gordon scored a career-high 33 points in a 113–108 loss to the Los Angeles Clippers. On February 18, 2017, he participated in his second consecutive Slam Dunk Contest, but failed to make it past the first round. On March 31, 2017, he scored 20 of his 32 points in the first half of the Magic's 117–116 loss to the Boston Celtics. He also had 16 rebounds in the game. In the Magic's season finale on April 12, Gordon had 32 points and 12 rebounds in a 113–109 win over the Detroit Pistons.

2017–18 season
On October 24, 2017, Gordon scored a career-high 41 points, including the go-ahead 3-pointer with 36 seconds remaining, to lift the Magic to a 125–121 win over the Brooklyn Nets. On November 29, 2017, he had 40 points and 15 rebounds to help Orlando end a nine-game losing streak with a 121–108 win over the Oklahoma City Thunder. On December 30, 2017, he had a 39-point effort in a 117–111 loss to the Miami Heat. Gordon missed nine games in February, including the All-Star Slam Dunk contest, with a strained left hip flexor. On March 24, 2018, he had 29 points, 11 rebounds and a career-high eight assists in a 105–99 win over the Phoenix Suns.

2018–19 season
On July 6, 2018, Gordon re-signed with the Magic. In the Magic's season opener on October 17, Gordon had 26 points and 16 rebounds in a 104–101 win over the Miami Heat. On November 18, he scored 20 of his 31 points in the first quarter of the Magic's 131–117 win over the New York Knicks. On January 2, 2019, Gordon had a then career-high nine assists in a 112–84 win over the Chicago Bulls. Thanks to a 42–40 record, the Magic qualified for the postseason for the first time since 2012 and faced the Toronto Raptors during their first round series. On April 13, 2019, Gordon made his playoff debut, recording ten points, ten rebounds, three assists and three steals in a 104–101 Game 1 win. The Magic ended up losing the series in five games, as the Raptors went on to win the NBA Finals.

2019–20 season
On December 4, 2019, Gordon scored a season-high 32 points, alongside five rebounds and five assists, in a 128–114 win over the Phoenix Suns. Gordon was runner-up in the Slam Dunk Contest to Derrick Jones Jr. during the 2020 NBA All-Star Weekend. They both had perfect scores in their first two dunks in the second round, forcing an overtime round. After they both earned perfect scores on their initial dunks, Jones won by scoring a 48 after taking off just past the free throw line to complete a windmill dunk; Gordon received a 47 after dunking over  Tacko Fall. On February 28, Gordon recorded his first career triple-double with 17 points, 11 rebounds and 12 assists in a 136–125 win over the Minnesota Timberwolves. Despite the Magic qualifying for the playoffs for a second straight season, Gordon did not play in the team's first round series due to a hamstring injury he suffered in the NBA Bubble. The Magic were eliminated by the Milwaukee Bucks in the first round of the playoffs.

2020–21 season
On March 19, 2021, Gordon posted a season-high 38 points, 6 rebounds and 4 assists in a 121–113 victory against the Brooklyn Nets, ending the Magics' nine-game losing streak and stopping the Nets' winning streak at six games. In his efforts, Gordon knocked down a career-high seven 3-pointers. On March 22, it was reported that Gordon had requested a trade from the Magic.

Denver Nuggets (2021–present)
On March 25, 2021, Gordon and Gary Clark were traded to the Denver Nuggets in exchange for Gary Harris, R. J. Hampton and a future first-round pick. Gordon had played and started in 25 games and was averaging 14.6 points, 6.6 rebounds and 4.2 assists in 29 minutes of action while shooting 37.5% from three-point range with the Magic for the season. On March 28, he made his Nuggets debut in a 126–102 win against the Atlanta Hawks, logging 13 points and two rebounds in 21 minutes of action. The Nuggets qualified for the playoffs, but they lost in four games to the Phoenix Suns during the Western Conference Semifinals.

On January 11, 2022, Gordon scored a season-high 30 points, alongside 12 rebounds, in a 85–87 loss to the Los Angeles Clippers. During the first round of the playoffs, the Nuggets lost in five games to the eventual champions, the Golden State Warriors.

During the 2022–23 season, Gordon was discussed as a potential NBA All-Star selection. However, he ultimately wasn't selected.

National team career
Gordon led Team USA to the 2011 FIBA Americas Under-16 Championship gold medal, with team-highs of 17.0 points, 11.2 rebounds and 3.2 blocks per game. He went on to earn MVP honors, while leading the United States to a gold medal at the 2013 FIBA Under-19 World Cup, in Prague, where he averaged team highs of 16.2 points and 6.2 rebounds per game, in addition to shooting 61.2 percent from the field. He was also named to the 2011–12 USA Developmental National Team, and participated at the 2010 USA Basketball Developmental National Team mini-camp.

Personal life
Gordon is the son of former San Diego State basketball star Ed Gordon who is African American and Shelly Davis Gordon who is White American. Gordon's great-great grandfather, a Native American Osage Indian, was seven feet tall. Gordon's older brother, Drew, is also a professional basketball player. His older sister, Elise, played collegiately for the Harvard women's basketball team from 2010 to 2014. As an eight-year-old, Gordon qualified to compete in the 100- and 200-meter dashes at the Junior Olympics, but chose instead to play in a basketball tournament.

Gordon is currently the president of athlete acquisition for the sports psychology app, Lucid, introduced to him by his mental skills coach, Graham Betchart.

Gordon made his acting debut as Casper in Uncle Drew, which was released in June 2018.

Gordon released his debut single "Pull Up" ft. Moe on the 7th April 2020.

Media figure and business interests

Endorsements
Gordon signed a partnership agreement with Chinese leading sports brand 361º in 2020. Gordon will serve as the new face of the company's basketball division. The multi-year partnership will include an Aaron Gordon signature shoe and apparel line as well as provide support for Aaron Gordon's charitable initiatives and Foundational work.

Philanthropy
Gordon, a co-winner of the 2019 Rich and Helen DeVos Community Enrichment award, recently made a financial contribution to the Homeless Education Fund at the Foundation for Orange County (Florida) Public Schools in hopes of helping children adversely affected by school districts canceling classes in the wake of the coronavirus pandemic.

Career statistics

NBA

Regular season

|-
| style="text-align:left;"|
| style="text-align:left;"|Orlando
| 47 || 8 || 17.0 || .447 || .271 || .721 || 3.6 || .7 || .4 || .5 || 5.2
|-
| style="text-align:left;"|
| style="text-align:left;"|Orlando
| 78 || 37 || 23.9 || .473 || .296 || .668 || 6.5 || 1.6 || .8 || .7 || 9.2
|-
| style="text-align:left;"|
| style="text-align:left;"|Orlando
| 80 || 72 || 28.7 || .454 || .288 || .719 || 5.1 || 1.9 || .8 || .5 || 12.7
|-
| style="text-align:left;"|
| style="text-align:left;"|Orlando
| 58 || 57 || 32.9 || .434 || .336 || .698 || 7.9 || 2.3 || 1.0 || .8 || 17.6
|-
| style="text-align:left;"|
| style="text-align:left;"|Orlando
| 78 || 78 || 33.8 || .449 || .349 || .731 || 7.4 || 3.7 || .7 || .7 || 16.0
|-
| style="text-align:left;"|
| style="text-align:left;"|Orlando
| 62 || 62 || 32.5 || .437 || .308 || .674 || 7.7 || 3.7 || .8 || .6 || 14.4 
|-
| style="text-align:left;"|
| style="text-align:left;"|Orlando
| 25 || 25 || 29.4 || .437 || .375 || .629 || 6.6 || 4.2 || .6 || .8 || 14.6
|-
| style="text-align:left;"|
| style="text-align:left;"|Denver
| 25 || 25 || 25.9 || .500 || .266 || .705 || 4.7 || 2.2 || .7 || .6 || 10.2
|-
| style="text-align:left;"|
| style="text-align:left;"|Denver
| 75 || 75 || 31.7 || .520 || .335 || .743 || 5.9 || 2.5 || .6 || .6 || 15.0
|- class="sortbottom"
| style="text-align:center;" colspan="2"|Career
| 528 || 439 || 28.9 || .460 || .323 || .702 || 6.3 || 2.5 || .7 || .6 || 13.0

Playoffs

|-
| style="text-align:left;"|2019
| style="text-align:left;"|Orlando
| 5 || 5 || 32.8 || .468 || .400 || .526 || 7.2 || 3.6 || 1.2 || .2 || 15.2
|-
| style="text-align:left;"|2021
| style="text-align:left;"|Denver
| 10 || 10 || 29.9 || .434 || .391 || .640 || 5.4 || 2.0 || .5 || .3 || 11.1
|-
| style="text-align:left;"|2022
| style="text-align:left;"|Denver
| 5 || 5 || 32.0 || .426 || .200 || .714 || 7.2 || 2.6 || .4 || 1.2 || 13.8
|- class="sortbottom"
| style="text-align:center;" colspan="2"|Career
| 20 || 20 || 31.2 || .442 || .345 || .639 || 6.3 || 2.6 || .7 || .5 || 12.8

College

|-
| style="text-align:left;"|2013–14
| style="text-align:left;"|Arizona
| 38 || 38 || 31.2 || .495 || .356 || .422 || 8.0 || 2.0 || .9 || 1.0 || 12.4

Awards and honors
High school

 2013: USA Basketball Male Athlete of the Year
 2013: FIBA Under-19 World Cup MVP
 2013: McDonald's All-American Game MVP
 Jordan Brand All-American (2013)
 2× California Mr. Basketball (2012, 2013)
 2× CIF State champion (2011, 2012)
 2× CIF State Division II champion (2011, 2012)
 3× CIF Northern California champion (2011–2013)
 CIF Northern California Open Division champion (2013)
 2× CIF Northern California Division II champion (2011, 2012)
 4× CIF CCS champion (2010–2013)
 CIF CCS Open Division champion (2013)
 3× CIF CCS Division II champion (2010–2012)
 MaxPreps.com All-American First Team (2013)
 San Jose Mercury News Player of the Year (2013)
 San Jose Mercury News First Team (2013)
 Cal-Hi Sports Bay Area CCS Player of the Year (2013)
 3× WCAL champion (2011–2013)
 3× Ed Fennelly WCAL Player of the Year Award (2011–2013)
 3× All-WCAL First Team (2011–2013)
 All-WCAL Second Team (2010)

College
 Pac-12 Freshman Student-Athlete of the Year (2014)
 Pac-12 All-Tournament Team (2014)
 AP Honorable Mention (2014)
 NCAA tournament's West Regional All-Tournament Team (2014)
 Third team All-America – Sporting News (2014)
 USBWA All-District Team (2014)
 NABC All-District Second Team (2014)
 All-Pac-12 First Team (2014)
 Pac-12 All-Freshman Team (2014)
 Pac-12 Freshman Player of the Year (2014)
 Pac-12 All-Rookie First Team (2014)

References

External links

 Arizona Wildcats bio

1995 births
Living people
African-American basketball players
All-American college men's basketball players
American men's basketball players
American people of Osage descent
Arizona Wildcats men's basketball players
Basketball players from San Jose, California
Denver Nuggets players
McDonald's High School All-Americans
Orlando Magic draft picks
Orlando Magic players
Parade High School All-Americans (boys' basketball)
Power forwards (basketball)
Small forwards
21st-century African-American sportspeople